Heidi Swedberg (born ) is an American actress and musician. She is best known for her role as Susan Ross, the fiancée of George Costanza, on the television sitcom Seinfeld.

Early life
Swedberg was born in Honolulu, Hawaii and raised in New Mexico. She attended Sandia High School in Albuquerque from 1980 to 1984.

Career

Acting

After graduation, Swedberg moved to Kentucky, where she spent a year at the Actors Theatre of Louisville. Her first film role was in Norman Jewison's In Country (1989). She then appeared in Welcome Home, Roxy Carmichael and Kindergarten Cop (both 1990); and in Too Much Sun, and the Jim Abrahams comedy spoof Hot Shots! (both 1991).

She also had guest roles in a number of television series, including Matlock, Thirtysomething, Quantum Leap, Brooklyn Bridge, Northern Exposure, Sisters, Roc and Touched by an Angel.

She then took on the role of Susan Ross in the long-running TV comedy Seinfeld (11 episodes in season four, 16 episodes in season seven, and in a flashback in season nine's 'backward' episode). 

Swedberg was not in Seinfeld'''s fifth season (1994) but starred regularly in other television shows, including Empty Nest, Murder, She Wrote, Star Trek: Deep Space Nine, and Grace Under Fire. She also made a guest appearance in Wizards of Waverly Place as Jennifer Majorheely.

Music
While living in Hawaii, Swedberg grew up playing the ukulele. In 1992, when playing a singer/songwriter for a television pilot, she began playing the instrument again. She plays it and sings in her band, Heidi Swedberg and The Sukey Jump Band, with whom she has released the albums PLAY! (2009) and My Cup of Tea'' (2013). 

Swedberg appears at ukulele festivals and nightclubs with her other band, The Smoking Jackets, with multi-instrumentalists Daniel Ward, Craig McClelland and John Bartlit.

Personal life
Swedberg was married to Philip Holahan from 1994 until their divorce in 2019. They have two daughters.

Filmography

Film

Television

References

External links
 Official website
 
 

Living people
20th-century American actresses
21st-century American actresses
Actresses from Honolulu
Actresses from Albuquerque, New Mexico
American film actresses
American television actresses
Year of birth missing (living people)